Huitong County is a county of Hunan Province, China, it is under the administration of Huaihua Prefecturel-level City.

Located on the west central margin of the province, the county lies to the east of the border of Guizhou. It is bordered to the north by Zhijiang County and Hongjiang City, to the east and southeast by Suining County, to the south by Jingzhou County, to the west by Tianzhu County of Guizhou. Huitong County has eight towns and 10 townships under its jurisdiction, the government seat is Lincheng.

Climate

References

External links 
www.xzqh.org 

 
County-level divisions of Hunan
Huaihua